Disa stairsii is a species of Disa of the family Orchidaceae that can be found growing with the giant heathers on the Rwenzori Mountains of mountains in East Tropical Africa as well as in the Congo in West-Central Tropical Africa.

Common in the heathbelt of the Ruwenzori Range Disa stairsii is cardinal red, distinct from the other foliage by its single spur which is borne on the top of its flower and is generally growing in moss between the altitudes of 2,800 - 3,400 meters (9,200 - 11,000 feet).

On Kilimanjaro D. stairsii also grows among the heath  along with Erica arborea and Erica rossi, is "small pink flowered" and is hidden by clumps of grasses along with the white flowered Anemone thomsonii.

References

External links

 

stairsii
Flora of East Tropical Africa
Flora of West-Central Tropical Africa
Orchids of Africa